Suru (also Romanized as Sūrū; also known as Shūru and Soroo) is a village in Moghuyeh Rural District, in the Central District of Bandar Lengeh County, Hormozgan Province, Iran. At the 2006 census, its population was 321, in 60 families.

References 

Populated places in Bandar Lengeh County